The following is a partial list of the "D" codes for Medical Subject Headings (MeSH), as defined by the United States National Library of Medicine (NLM).

This list continues the information at List of MeSH codes (D01). Codes following these are found at List of MeSH codes (D03). For other MeSH codes, see List of MeSH codes.

The source for this content is the set of 2006 MeSH Trees from the NLM.

– organic chemicals

– alcohols

– amino alcohols
  – ethanolamines
  – albuterol
  – choline
  – platelet activating factor
  – clenbuterol
  – deanol
  – epinephrine
  – ethanolamine
  – 2-hydroxyphenethylamine
  – isoproterenol
  – labetalol
  – midodrine
  – norepinephrine
  – normetanephrine
  – octopamine
  – orciprenaline
  – fenoterol
  – phenylephrine
  – etilefrine
  – procaterol
  – sotalol
  – synephrine
  – terbutaline
  – heptaminol
  – isoetharine
  – propanolamines
  – acebutolol
  – alprenolol
  – dihydroalprenolol
  – atenolol
  – betaxolol
  – bisoprolol
  – bupranolol
  – carteolol
  – celiprolol
  – ephedrine
  – histidinol
  – isoxsuprine
  – levobunolol
  – methoxamine
  – metipranolol
  – metoprolol
  – nadolol
  – nylidrin
  – oxprenolol
  – oxyfedrine
  – penbutolol
  – phenylpropanolamine
  – p-hydroxynorephedrine
  – metaraminol
  – pindolol
  – iodocyanopindolol
  – practolol
  – prenalterol
  – propranolol
  – ritodrine
  – suloctidil
  – timolol
  – xamoterol
  – sphingosine
  – psychosine

– benzyl alcohols
  – benzyl alcohol

– chlorohydrins
  – alpha-chlorohydrin
  – chlorobutanol
  – ethchlorvynol
  – ethylene chlorohydrin

– ethanol
  – ethamoxytriphetol
  – ethanolamines
  – ethanolamine
  – ethylene chlorohydrin
  – mercaptoethanol
  – phenylethyl alcohol
  – trifluoroethanol

– fatty alcohols
  – butanols
  – 1-butanol
  – chlorobutanol
  – tert-butyl alcohol
  – dodecanol
  – sodium dodecyl sulfate
  – dolichol
  – dolichol phosphates
  – farnesol
  – heptanol
  – hexanols
  – octanols
  – 1-octanol
  – pentanols
  – sodium tetradecyl sulfate

– glycols
  – butylene glycols
  – busulfan
  – ethylene glycols
  – chloral hydrate
  – chloralose
  – ethylene glycol
  – methoxyhydroxyphenylglycol
  – polyethylene glycols
  – cetomacrogol
  – hydrogel
  – nonoxynol
  – octoxynol
  – poloxalene
  – poloxamer
  – polyhydroxyethyl methacrylate
  – polysorbates
  – propylene glycols
  – alpha-chlorohydrin
  – chloramphenicol
  – thiamphenicol
  – chlorphenesin
  – mephenesin
  – pentaerythritol tetranitrate
  – propylene glycol
  – tromethamine
  – sphingosine

– hexanols
  – cyclohexanols
  – menthol
  – tramadol

– methanol
  – nicotinyl alcohol

– polyvinyl alcohol

– propanols
  – 1-propanol
  – 2-propanol
  – propanolamines
  – acebutolol
  – alprenolol
  – dihydroalprenolol
  – atenolol
  – betaxolol
  – bisoprolol
  – bupranolol
  – carteolol
  – celiprolol
  – ephedrine
  – histidinol
  – isoxsuprine
  – levobunolol
  – methoxamine
  – metipranolol
  – metoprolol
  – nadolol
  – nylidrin
  – oxprenolol
  – oxyfedrine
  – penbutolol
  – phenylpropanolamine
  – p-hydroxynorephedrine
  – metaraminol
  – pindolol
  – iodocyanopindolol
  – practolol
  – prenalterol
  – propranolol
  – ritodrine
  – suloctidil
  – timolol
  – xamoterol

– sugar alcohols
  – dithioerythritol
  – dithiothreitol
  – erythritol
  – erythrityl tetranitrate
  – galactitol
  – dianhydrogalactitol
  – mitolactol
  – glycerol
  – glyceryl ethers
  – phospholipid ethers
  – nitroglycerin
  – inositol
  – inositol phosphates
  – inositol 1,4,5-trisphosphate
  – phytic acid
  – mannitol
  – mannitol phosphates
  – mitobronitol
  – ribitol
  – sorbitol
  – isosorbide
  – isosorbide dinitrate
  – meglumine
  – diatrizoate meglumine
  – iothalamate meglumine
  – xylitol

– aldehydes

– acetaldehyde
  – paraldehyde

– acrolein

– benzaldehydes

– formaldehyde
  – formocresols

– furaldehyde

– glutaral

– glyceraldehyde
  – glyceraldehyde 3-phosphate

– glyoxal
  – phenylglyoxal
  – pyruvaldehyde

– malondialdehyde
  – thiobarbituric acid reactive substances

– o-phthalaldehyde

– retinaldehyde

– amides

– acetamides
  – 2-acetylaminofluorene
  – acetoxyacetylaminofluorene
  – hydroxyacetylaminofluorene
  – allylisopropylacetamide
  – benzeneacetamides
  – bufexamac
  – iodoacetamide
  – piracetam
  – thioacetamide

– acrylamides
  – acrylamide

– anilides
  – acetanilides
  – acetaminophen
  – diamfenetide
  – etidocaine
  – inosine pranobex
  – lidocaine
  – phenacetin
  – practolol
  – trimecaine
  – benzoylarginine nitroanilide
  – bupivacaine
  – carbanilides
  – imidocarb
  – nicarbazin
  – carboxin
  – encainide
  – flutamide
  – prilocaine
  – propanil
  – salicylanilides
  – niclosamide
  – oxyclozanide
  – rafoxanide
  – tocainide

– benzamides
  – cisapride
  – deet
  – dinitolmide
  – hippurates
  – aminohippuric acids
  – p-aminohippuric acid
  – iodohippuric acid
  – indoramin
  – metoclopramide
  – moclobemide
  – procainamide
  – procarbazine
  – raclopride
  – remoxipride
  – sulpiride
  – tiapride

– benzoylarginine-2-naphthylamide

– cerulenin

– dibucaine

– formamides
  – dimethylformamide

– lactams
  – beta-lactams
  – carbapenems
  – thienamycins
  – imipenem
  – cephalosporins
  – cefamandole
  – cefoperazone
  – cefazolin
  – cefonicid
  – cefsulodin
  – cephacetrile
  – cefotaxime
  – cefixime
  – cefmenoxime
  – cefotiam
  – ceftizoxime
  – ceftriaxone
  – cefuroxime
  – cephalothin
  – cephapirin
  – cephalexin
  – cefaclor
  – cefadroxil
  – cefatrizine
  – cephaloglycin
  – cephradine
  – cephaloridine
  – ceftazidime
  – cephamycins
  – cefmetazole
  – cefotetan
  – cefoxitin
  – clavulanic acids
  – clavulanic acid
  – amoxicillin-potassium clavulanate combination
  – monobactams
  – aztreonam
  – moxalactam
  – penicillins
  – amdinocillin
  – amdinocillin pivoxil
  – cyclacillin
  – methicillin
  – nafcillin
  – oxacillin
  – cloxacillin
  – dicloxacillin
  – floxacillin
  – penicillanic acid
  – penicillin g
  – ampicillin
  – amoxicillin
  – amoxicillin-potassium clavulanate combination
  – azlocillin
  – mezlocillin
  – piperacillin
  – pivampicillin
  – talampicillin
  – carbenicillin
  – carfecillin
  – penicillin g, benzathine
  – penicillin g, procaine
  – sulbenicillin
  – penicillin v
  – sulbactam
  – ticarcillin
  – caprolactam
  – lactams, macrocyclic

– salicylamides
  – salicylanilides
  – niclosamide
  – oxyclozanide
  – rafoxanide

– sulfonamides
  – benzolamide
  – bumetanide
  – chloramines
  – chlorthalidone
  – clopamide
  – dichlorphenamide
  – ethoxzolamide
  – indapamide
  – mafenide
  – mefruside
  – metolazone
  – probenecid
  – sulfanilamides
  – furosemide
  – sulfacetamide
  – sulfachlorpyridazine
  – sulfadiazine
  – silver sulfadiazine
  – sulfadimethoxine
  – sulfadoxine
  – sulfaguanidine
  – sulfalene
  – sulfamerazine
  – sulfameter
  – sulfamethazine
  – sulfamethoxazole
  – trimethoprim-sulfamethoxazole combination
  – sulfamethoxypyridazine
  – sulfamonomethoxine
  – sulfamoxole
  – sulfaphenazole
  – sulfapyridine
  – sulfaquinoxaline
  – sulfathiazoles
  – sulfamethizole
  – sulfisomidine
  – sulfisoxazole
  – sulfasalazine
  – sumatriptan
  – xipamide

– thioamides
  – thioacetamide

– amidines

– benzamidines
  – diminazene
  – pentamidine

– chlorphenamidine

– guanidines
  – agmatine
  – bethanidine
  – biguanides
  – buformin
  – chlorhexidine
  – chloroguanide
  – metformin
  – phenformin
  – cimetidine
  – creatine
  – gabexate
  – guanabenz
  – guanethidine
  – guanfacine
  – guanidine
  – impromidine
  – 3-iodobenzylguanidine
  – methylguanidine
  – mitoguazone
  – nitrosoguanidines
  – methylnitronitrosoguanidine
  – pinacidil
  – robenidine
  – sulfaguanidine

– stilbamidines

– amines

– allylamine

– amino alcohols
  – ethanolamines
  – albuterol
  – choline
  – platelet activating factor
  – clenbuterol
  – deanol
  – epinephrine
  – ethanolamine
  – 2-hydroxyphenethylamine
  – isoproterenol
  – labetalol
  – midodrine
  – octopamine
  – orciprenaline
  – fenoterol
  – phenylephrine
  – etilefrine
  – procaterol
  – sotalol
  – synephrine
  – terbutaline
  – heptaminol
  – isoetharine
  – norepinephrine
  – normetanephrine
  – propanolamines
  – ephedrine
  – histidinol
  – methoxamine
  – phenoxypropanolamines
  – acebutolol
  – alprenolol
  – dihydroalprenolol
  – atenolol
  – betaxolol
  – bisoprolol
  – bupranolol
  – carteolol
  – celiprolol
  – levobunolol
  – metipranolol
  – metoprolol
  – nadolol
  – oxprenolol
  – penbutolol
  – pindolol
  – iodocyanopindolol
  – practolol
  – prenalterol
  – propranolol
  – xamoterol
  – phenylpropanolamine
  – p-hydroxynorephedrine
  – metaraminol
  – nylidrin
  – oxyfedrine
  – ritodrine
  – suloctidil
  – timolol
  – sphingosine
  – psychosine

– aminopyridines
  – 4-aminopyridine
  – amrinone
  – milrinone

– aniline compounds
  – aminophenols
  – phenetidine
  – anilino naphthalenesulfonates
  – benzophenoneidum
  – bromhexine
  – ambroxol
  – benzenaminium, 4,4'-(3-oxo-1,5-pentanediyl)bis(n,n-dimethyl-n-2-propenyl-), dibromide
  – p-dimethylaminoazobenzene
  – methyldimethylaminoazobenzene
  – diphenylamine
  – gentian violet
  – methyl green
  – methylenebis(chloroaniline)
  – phenylenediamines
  – tetramethylphenylenediamine
  – rosaniline dyes
  – toluidines
  – trifluralin

– benzylamines
  – pargyline

– biogenic amines
  – acetylcholine
  – biogenic monoamines
  – catecholamines
  – dopamine
  – epinephrine
  – metanephrine
  – norepinephrine
  – droxidopa
  – normetanephrine
  – orciprenaline
  – fenoterol
  – histamine
  – methylhistamines
  – 2-hydroxyphenethylamine
  – tryptamines
  – N,N-Dimethyltryptamine
  – methoxydimethyltryptamines
  – serotonin
  – 5-methoxytryptamine
  – tyramine
  – octopamine
  – synephrine
  – biogenic polyamines
  – cadaverine
  – putrescine
  – spermidine
  – spermine

– butylamines

– catecholamines
  – dihydroxyphenylalanine
  – cysteinyldopa
  – levodopa
  – methyldopa
  – carbidopa
  – dobutamine
  – dopamine
  – deoxyepinephrine
  – hydroxydopamines
  – oxidopamine
  – epinephrine
  – deoxyepinephrine
  – metanephrine
  – norepinephrine
  – droxidopa
  – nordefrin
  – normetanephrine
  – isoproterenol
  – orciprenaline
  – fenoterol

– cyclohexylamines
  – bromhexine
  – ambroxol

– ethylamines
  – cystamine
  – dibenzylchlorethamine
  – diethylamines
  – diethylpropion
  – diphenhydramine
  – dimenhydrinate
  – histamine
  – methylhistamines
  – mercaptoethylamines
  – cysteamine
  – orphenadrine
  – phenethylamines
  – albuterol
  – amphetamines
  – amphetamine
  – dextroamphetamine
  – p-chloroamphetamine
  – 2,5-dimethoxy-4-methylamphetamine
  – p-hydroxyamphetamine
  – iofetamine
  – methamphetamine
  – benzphetamine
  – 3,4-methylenedioxyamphetamine
  – n-methyl-3,4-methylenedioxyamphetamine
  – phentermine
  – chlorphentermine
  – mephentermine
  – butoxamine
  – dexfenfluramine
  – dimethoxyphenylethylamine
  – dobutamine
  – fendiline
  – fenfluramine
  – norfenfluramine
  – hexoprenaline
  – 2-hydroxyphenethylamine
  – isoxsuprine
  – mescaline
  – methoxamine
  – p-methoxy-n-methylphenethylamine
  – nylidrin
  – octopamine
  – oxyfedrine
  – prenylamine
  – ritodrine
  – selegiline
  – suloctidil
  – verapamil
  – gallopamil
  – phenoxybenzamine

– hydroxylamines
  – aminooxyacetic acid
  – hydroxamic acids
  – bufexamac
  – deferoxamine
  – ferrichrome
  – 4-hydroxyaminoquinoline-1-oxide
  – oximes
  – fluvoxamine
  – obidoxime chloride
  – pralidoxime compounds
  – technetium tc 99m exametazime
  – trimedoxime

– mannich bases

– methylamines
  – dimethylamines
  – moxisylyte

– 1-naphthylamine
  – sertraline

– 2-naphthylamine

– polyamines
  – colestipol
  – diamines
  – cadaverine
  – ethylenediamines
  – aminophylline
  – edetic acid
  – egtazic acid
  – ethambutol
  – methapyrilene
  – triethylenetetramine
  – tripelennamine
  – phenylenediamines
  – tetramethylphenylenediamine
  – putrescine
  – hexadimethrine
  – methenamine
  – pentetic acid
  – gadolinium dtpa
  – technetium tc 99m pentetate
  – spermidine
  – spermine

– propylamines
  – citalopram
  – clorgyline
  – fluoxetine
  – mexiletine
  – promethazine
  – tranylcypromine

– quaternary ammonium compounds
  – benzylammonium compounds
  – ambenonium chloride
  – benzalkonium compounds
  – benzethonium
  – bephenium compounds
  – bretylium compounds
  – bretylium tosylate
  – betalains
  – betacyanins
  – betaxanthins
  – bis-trimethylammonium compounds
  – decamethonium compounds
  – hexamethonium compounds
  – hexamethonium
  – emepronium
  – gallamine triethiodide
  – glycopyrrolate
  – hemicholinium 3
  – lissamine green dyes
  – oxyphenonium
  – phenylammonium compounds
  – (4-(m-chlorophenylcarbamoyloxy)-2-butynyl)trimethylammonium chloride
  – edrophonium
  – neostigmine
  – propantheline
  – tetraethylammonium compounds
  – tetraethylammonium
  – toxiferine
  – alcuronium
  – trimethyl ammonium compounds
  – betaine
  – bethanechol compounds
  – bethanechol
  – carnitine
  – acetylcarnitine
  – palmitoylcarnitine
  – cetrimonium compounds
  – chlorisondamine
  – chlormequat
  – choline
  – benzoylcholine
  – carbachol
  – cytidine diphosphate choline
  – phosphorylcholine
  – platelet activating factor
  – propylbenzilylcholine mustard
  – succinylcholine
  – thiocholine
  – acetylthiocholine
  – butyrylthiocholine
  – methacholine compounds
  – methacholine chloride
  – muscarine
  – tubocurarine

– anhydrides

– acetic anhydrides

– citraconic anhydrides

– maleic anhydrides

– phthalic anhydrides

– polyanhydrides

– succinic anhydrides

– aza compounds

– azacitidine

– azaguanine

– azauridine

– azides

– azo compounds

– amaranth dye

– amido black

– p-aminoazobenzene

– o-aminoazotoluene

– arsenazo iii

– p-azobenzenearsonate

– azoxymethane
  – cycasin
  – methylazoxymethanol acetate

– diamide

– diazonium compounds
  – diazomethane

– diazooxonorleucine

– dithizone

– Evans blue

– formazans

– tartrazine

– trypan blue

– boron compounds

– boranes
  – borohydrides
  – tetraphenylborate

– boric acids
  – borates

– borinic acids

– boronic acids

– carboxylic acids

– acids, acyclic

– acetic acids
  – acetamides
  – 2-acetylaminofluorene
  – acetoxyacetylaminofluorene
  – hydroxyacetylaminofluorene
  – allylisopropylacetamide
  – iodoacetamide
  – piracetam
  – thioacetamide
  – acetic acid
  – acetates
  – dichloroacetate
  – fluoroacetates
  – iodoacetates
  – potassium acetate
  – sodium acetate
  – thioglycolates
  – zinc acetate
  – acetic anhydrides
  – aminooxyacetic acid
  – edetic acid
  – egtazic acid
  – iodoacetic acid
  – iodoacetamide
  – iodoacetates
  – nitrilotriacetic acid
  – pentetic acid
  – gadolinium dtpa
  – technetium tc 99m pentetate
  – peracetic acid
  – phosphonoacetic acid
  – foscarnet
  – trichloroacetic acid
  – trifluoroacetic acid

– acrylates
  – acrylamides
  – acrylamide
  – cyanoacrylates
  – bucrylate
  – enbucrilate
  – methacrylates
  – bisphenol a-glycidyl methacrylate
  – polymethacrylic acids
  – methyl methacrylates
  – methyl methacrylate
  – polymethyl methacrylate
  – polyhydroxyethyl methacrylate
  – urocanic acid

– butyric acids
  – aminobutyric acids
  – aminoisobutyric acids
  – gamma-aminobutyric acid
  – baclofen
  – vigabatrin
  – butyric acid
  – butyrates
  – bezafibrate
  – clofenapate
  – clofibrate
  – clofibric acid
  – bezafibrate
  – clofenapate
  – clofibrate
  – gemfibrozil
  – procetofen
  – crotonic acids
  – crotonates
  – 3-hydroxybutyric acid
  – hydroxybutyrates
  – sodium oxybate

– caproates
  – aminocaproic acids
  – 6-aminocaproic acid
  – hexanoic acids
  – penicillic acid
  – mycophenolic acid

– caprylates
  – octanoic acids

– carbamates
  – albendazole
  – aldicarb
  – benomyl
  – carbadox
  – carbamyl phosphate
  – carbaryl
  – carisoprodol
  – diethylcarbamazine
  – fenbendazole
  – mebendazole
  – meprobamate
  – methocarbamol
  – methomyl
  – phenylcarbamates
  – carbofuran
  – chlorpropham
  – methiocarb
  – methocarbamol
  – physostigmine
  – propoxur
  – pyridinolcarbamate
  – thiocarbamates
  – dimethyldithiocarbamate
  – thiram
  – ziram
  – ditiocarb
  – disulfiram
  – ethylenebis(dithiocarbamates)
  – maneb
  – zineb
  – tolnaftate
  – triallate
  – thiophanate
  – urethane
  – nitrosomethylurethane
  – polyurethanes

– dicarboxylic acids
  – adipic acids
  – 2-aminoadipic acid
  – dimethyl adipimidate
  – bongkrekic acid
  – fumarates
  – glutarates
  – formiminoglutamic acid
  – ketoglutaric acids
  – meglutol
  – malates
  – thiomalates
  – gold sodium thiomalate
  – maleates
  – maleimides
  – ethylmaleimide
  – malonates
  – methylmalonic acid
  – phenylethylmalonamide
  – oxalic acids
  – oxalic acid
  – oxalates
  – calcium oxalate
  – oxaloacetic acids
  – oxaloacetates
  – oxaloacetate
  – pimelic acids
  – diaminopimelic acid
  – succinic acids
  – argininosuccinic acid
  – dioctyl sulfosuccinic acid
  – succimer
  – technetium tc 99m dimercaptosuccinic acid
  – succinic acid
  – succinates
  – succinic anhydrides
  – succinylcholine
  – tartrates
  – tartronates

– formic acids
  – formamides
  – dimethylformamide
  – formates
  – formic acid esters
  – diethyl pyrocarbonate

– imino acids
  – azetidinecarboxylic acid
  – technetium tc 99m diethyl-iminodiacetic acid
  – technetium tc 99m disofenin
  – technetium tc 99m lidofenin

– propionates
  – procetofen
  – propionic acids
  – flurbiprofen
  – 3-mercaptopropionic acid
  – nafenopin
  – propoxyphene

– sugar acids
  – ascorbic acid
  – dehydroascorbic acid
  – 2,3-diketogulonic acid
  – glucaric acid
  – gluconates
  – antimony sodium gluconate
  – calcium gluconate
  – glyceric acids
  – diphosphoglyceric acids
  – 2,3-diphosphoglycerate
  – muramic acids
  – neuraminic acids
  – sialic acids
  – cytidine monophosphate n-acetylneuraminic acid
  – n-acetylneuraminic acid
  – tartrates
  – tartronates
  – uronic acids
  – glucuronic acids
  – glucuronic acid
  – glucuronates
  – glucuronides
  – hexuronic acids
  – iduronic acid

– tricarboxylic acids
  – aconitic acid
  – 1-carboxyglutamic acid
  – citrates
  – calcium citrate
  – citric acid
  – isocitrates
  – potassium citrate

– valerates
  – pentanoic acids
  – gemfibrozil
  – valproic acid
  – proadifen

– acids, aldehydic
  – glyoxylates
  – oxamic acid
  – uronic acids
  – glucuronic acids
  – glucuronic acid
  – glucuronates
  – glucuronides
  – hexuronic acids
  – iduronic acid

– acids, carbocyclic

– benzoic acids
  – aminobenzoic acids
  – 4-aminobenzoic acid
  – acecainide
  – benzocaine
  – procainamide
  – procaine
  – penicillin g procaine
  – propoxycaine
  – tetracaine
  – anthranilic acids
  – flufenamic acid
  – glafenine
  – 3-hydroxyanthranilic acid
  – meclofenamic acid
  – mefenamic acid
  – ethopabate
  – benzamides
  – aminohippuric acids
  – p-aminohippuric acid
  – cisapride
  – deet
  – dinitolmide
  – hippurates
  – indoramin
  – iodohippuric acid
  – metoclopramide
  – moclobemide
  – procainamide
  – procarbazine
  – raclopride
  – remoxipride
  – sulpiride
  – tiapride
  – benzoic acid
  – benzoates
  – bromobenzoates
  – chlorobenzoates
  – iodobenzoates
  – triiodobenzoic acids
  – acetrizoic acid
  – diatrizoate
  – diatrizoate meglumine
  – iodamide
  – iodipamide
  – ioglycamic acid
  – iohexol
  – iopamidol
  – iothalamate meglumine
  – iothalamic acid
  – ioxaglic acid
  – metrizoate
  – metrizamide
  – mercuribenzoates
  – chloromercuribenzoates
  – p-chloromercuribenzoic acid
  – hydroxymercuribenzoates
  – nitrobenzoates
  – dithionitrobenzoic acid
  – sodium benzoate
  – benzoyl peroxide
  – benzoylcholine
  – bumetanide
  – dicamba
  – hexobendine
  – hydroxybenzoic acids
  – gallic acid
  – hydrolyzable tannins
  – propyl gallate
  – hydroxymercuribenzoates
  – pactamycin
  – parabens
  – salicylic acids
  – aminosalicylic acids
  – p-aminosalicylic acid
  – mesalamine
  – anacardic acids
  – aspirin
  – diflunisal
  – salicylic acid
  – salicylates
  – gentisates
  – sodium salicylate
  – vanillic acid
  – trimebutine

– cinnamates
  – caffeic acids
  – eugenol
  – chlorogenic acid
  – cinanserin
  – coumaric acids
  – puromycin
  – puromycin aminonucleoside

– cyclohexanecarboxylic acids
  – abscisic acid
  – aurintricarboxylic acid
  – chlorogenic acid
  – chorismic acid
  – dicyclomine
  – quinic acid
  – shikimic acid
  – tilidine
  – tranexamic acid

– mandelic acids
  – cyclandelate
  – vanilmandelic acid

– phenylacetates
  – cyclopentolate
  – diclofenac
  – 3,4-dihydroxyphenylacetic acid
  – diphenylacetic acids
  – benzilates
  – benactyzine
  – quinuclidinyl benzilate
  – guanfacine
  – homogentisic acid
  – homovanillic acid
  – methylphenidate
  – propanidid

– phenylbutyrates

– phenylpropionates
  – fenoprofen
  – ibuprofen
  – indoprofen
  – ketoprofen
  – suprofen

– phenylpyruvic acids

– phthalic acids
  – dibutyl phthalate
  – diethylhexyl phthalate
  – o-phthalaldehyde
  – phthalic anhydrides
  – phthalimides
  – thalidomide

– esters

– humic substances

– hydroxy acids
  – benzilates
  – benactyzine
  – quinuclidinyl benzilate
  – glycolates
  – 2,4-dichlorophenoxyacetic acid
  – halofenate
  – meclofenoxate
  – 2-methyl-4-chlorophenoxyacetic acid
  – phenoxyacetates
  – ethacrynic acid
  – ticrynafen
  – 2,4,5-trichlorophenoxyacetic acid
  – hydroxamic acids
  – bufexamac
  – deferoxamine
  – ferrichrome
  – 3-hydroxyanthranilic acid
  – hydroxybenzoic acids
  – gallic acid
  – hydrolyzable tannins
  – propyl gallate
  – hydroxymercuribenzoates
  – pactamycin
  – parabens
  – salicylic acids
  – aminosalicylic acids
  – p-aminosalicylic acid
  – mesalamine
  – anacardic acids
  – aspirin
  – diflunisal
  – salicylic acid
  – salicylates
  – gentisates
  – sodium salicylate
  – vanillic acid
  – 3-hydroxybutyric acid
  – hydroxybutyrates
  – sodium oxybate
  – lactates
  – lactic acid
  – sodium lactate
  – malates
  – mandelic acids
  – cyclandelate
  – vanilmandelic acid
  – mevalonic acid
  – mycolic acids
  – phosphoenolpyruvate
  – quinic acid
  – shikimic acid
  – sugar acids
  – ascorbic acid
  – dehydroascorbic acid
  – 2,3-diketogulonic acid
  – glucaric acid
  – gluconates
  – antimony sodium gluconate
  – calcium gluconate
  – glyceric acids
  – diphosphoglyceric acids
  – 2,3-diphosphoglycerate
  – muramic acids
  – neuraminic acids
  – sialic acids
  – cytidine monophosphate n-acetylneuraminic acid
  – n-acetylneuraminic acid
  – tartrates
  – tartronates
  – uronic acids
  – glucuronic acids
  – glucuronic acid
  – glucuronates
  – glucuronides
  – hexuronic acids
  – iduronic acid

– keto acids
  – acetoacetates
  – hippurates
  – aminohippuric acids
  – p-aminohippuric acid
  – iodohippuric acid
  – ketoglutaric acids
  – levulinic acids
  – aminolevulinic acid
  – oxaloacetic acids
  – oxaloacetates
  – oxaloacetate
  – pyruvates
  – phenylpyruvic acids
  – pyruvic acid

– catenanes

– dna, catenated

– cyanates

– thiocyanates

– ethers

– acetals

– ethers, cyclic
  – ciguatoxins
  – crown ethers
  – epoxy compounds
  – epichlorohydrin
  – ethylene oxide
  – trichloroepoxypropane
  – okadaic acid
  – oxepins
  – doxepin
  – oxocins

– ethoglucid

– ethyl ethers
  – ether, ethyl
  – flurothyl
  – methoxyflurane
  – phenetidine

– glyceryl ethers
  – phospholipid ethers

– methyl ethers
  – anisoles
  – anethole trithione
  – butylated hydroxyanisole
  – bis(chloromethyl) ether
  – enflurane
  – guaiacol
  – guaifenesin
  – methocarbamol
  – isoflurane
  – methoxyflurane

– phenyl ethers
  – anisoles
  – anethole trithione
  – butylated hydroxyanisole
  – guaiacol
  – guaifenesin
  – phenetidine
  – triclosan

– free radicals

– peroxides
  – artemisinins
  – lipid peroxides
  – tert-butylhydroperoxide
  – tetraoxanes

– spin labels
  – triacetoneamine-n-oxyl

– glycosylation end products, advanced

– hydrazines

– benserazide

– carbidopa

– hydrazones
  – carbonyl cyanide m-chlorophenyl hydrazone
  – carbonyl cyanide-p-trifluoromethoxyphenylhydrazone

– iproniazid

– isoniazid

– methylhydrazines
  – dimethylhydrazines
  – 1,2-dimethylhydrazine
  – monomethylhydrazine

– phenelzine

– phenylhydrazines
  – dithizone

– todralazine

– hydrocarbons

– hydrocarbons, acyclic
  – alkanes
  – alkanesulfonic acids
  – alkanesulfonates
  – mesna
  – mesylates
  – busulfan
  – ethyl methanesulfonate
  – methyl methanesulfonate
  – hepes
  – isethionic acid
  – taurine
  – taurocholic acid
  – taurodeoxycholic acid
  – taurochenodeoxycholic acid
  – taurolithocholic acid
  – butanes
  – ethane
  – ethylene dichlorides
  – fumonisins
  – heptanes
  – diarylheptanoids
  – curcumin
  – hexanes
  – methane
  – tetranitromethane
  – nitroparaffins
  – tetranitromethane
  – octanes
  – pentanes
  – propane
  – alkenes
  – allyl compounds
  – allylamine
  – allylglycine
  – allylisopropylacetamide
  – ethylenes
  – dichloroethylenes
  – polyenes
  – alkadienes
  – butadienes
  – chloroprene
  – aurodox
  – diphenylhexatriene
  – filipin
  – mepartricin
  – neoprene
  – polyethylenes
  – polyethylene
  – polyethyleneimine
  – polypropylenes
  – polyvinyls
  – squalene
  – vinyl compounds
  – polyvinyls
  – polyvinyl alcohol
  – polyvinyl chloride
  – polyvinylpyridine n-oxide
  – povidone
  – povidone-iodine
  – vinyl chloride
  – alkynes
  – acetylene
  – carbocyanines
  – (4-(m-chlorophenylcarbamoyloxy)-2-butynyl)trimethylammonium chloride

– hydrocarbons, cyclic
  – bridged compounds
  – adamantane
  – amantadine
  – memantine
  – methenamine
  – rimantadine
  – bicyclo compounds
  – bicyclo compounds, heterocyclic
  – biperiden
  – hydrocarbons, alicyclic
  – cycloparaffins
  – adamantane
  – rimantadine
  – cyclobutanes
  – cyclodecanes
  – taxoids
  – paclitaxel
  – cycloheptanes
  – azulenes
  – bencyclane
  – tropolone
  – cyclohexanes
  – cuprizone
  – cyclamates
  – cyclohexanecarboxylic acids
  – cyclohexanols
  – cyclohexanones
  – cyclohexylamines
  – dicyclomine
  – ketamine
  – norisoprenoids
  – tiletamine
  – trans-1,4-bis(2-chlorobenzaminomethyl)cyclohexane dihydrochloride
  – cyclooctanes
  – iprindole
  – cyclopentanes
  – cycloleucine
  – cyclopropanes
  – cilastatin
  – hypoglycins
  – hydrocarbons, aromatic
  – benzene
  – benzene derivatives
  – benzeneacetamides
  – bufexamac
  – benzenesulfonates
  – calcium dobesilate
  – 4-chloromercuribenzenesulfonate
  – ethamsylate
  – ferrozine
  – polyanetholesulfonate
  – tiron
  – benzhydryl compounds
  – diphenhydramine
  – dimenhydrinate
  – meclizine
  – methylenebis(chloroaniline)
  – orphenadrine
  – terfenadine
  – benzyl compounds
  – benzyl alcohols
  – benzyl alcohol
  – benzylamines
  – pargyline
  – bibenzyls
  – 2-hydroxy-5-nitrobenzyl bromide
  – lignans
  – flavonolignans
  – nordihydroguaiaretic acid
  – podophyllotoxin
  – benzylidene compounds
  – stilbenes
  – 4-acetamido-4'-isothiocyanatostilbene-2,2'-disulfonic acid
  – bibenzyls
  – chlorotrianisene
  – clomiphene
  – diethylstilbestrol
  – hexestrol
  – 4,4'-diisothiocyanostilbene-2,2'-disulfonic acid
  – stilbamidines
  – tamoxifen
  – raloxifene
  – toremifene
  – styrenes
  – styrene
  – polystyrenes
  – tyrphostins
  – biphenyl compounds
  – aminobiphenyl compounds
  – benzidines
  – 3,3'-diaminobenzidine
  – dianisidine
  – 3,3'-dichlorobenzidine
  – losartan
  – niclofolan
  – polybrominated biphenyls
  – polychlorinated biphenyls
  – bromobenzenes
  – chlorobenzenes
  – chlorophenols
  – hexachlorophene
  – dicofol
  – dinitrochlorobenzene
  – hexachlorobenzene
  – iodobenzenes
  – 3-iodobenzylguanidine
  – iopanoic acid
  – iophendylate
  – ipodate
  – tyropanoate
  – nitrobenzenes
  – chloramphenicol
  – thiamphenicol
  – dinitrobenzenes
  – dinitrochlorobenzene
  – dinitrofluorobenzene
  – trinitrobenzenes
  – trinitrobenzenesulfonic acid
  – sulfanilic acids
  – terphenyl compounds
  – polychloroterphenyl compounds
  – toluene
  – bromcresol green
  – bromcresol purple
  – bromphenol blue
  – bromthymol blue
  – toluene 2,4-diisocyanate
  – toluidines
  – tosyl compounds
  – tosylarginine methyl ester
  – tosyllysine chloromethyl ketone
  – tosylphenylalanyl chloromethyl ketone
  – trifluralin
  – trinitrotoluene
  – triparanol
  – trityl compounds
  – xylenes
  – diarylheptanoids
  – curcumin

– hydrocarbons, halogenated
  – halothane
  – hydrocarbons, brominated
  – bromobenzenes
  – bromotrichloromethane
  – ethylene dibromide
  – polybrominated biphenyls
  – hydrocarbons, chlorinated
  – aldrin
  – carbon tetrachloride
  – chlordan
  – chlordecone
  – chlorobenzenes
  – dicofol
  – dinitrochlorobenzene
  – hexachlorobenzene
  – chlorofluorocarbons
  – chlorofluorocarbons, methane
  – chloroform
  – bromotrichloromethane
  – dichlorodiphenyldichloroethane
  – dichlorodiphenyl dichloroethylene
  – ddt
  – dichloroethylenes
  – dieldrin
  – endrin
  – ethyl chloride
  – ethylene dichlorides
  – heptachlor
  – heptachlor epoxide
  – lindane
  – methoxychlor
  – methyl chloride
  – methylene chloride
  – mirex
  – mitotane
  – picryl chloride
  – polychlorinated biphenyls
  – aroclors
  – aroclor 1254
  – polychloroterphenyl compounds
  – aroclors
  – aroclor 1254
  – tetrachloroethylene
  – toxaphene
  – trichloroepoxypropane
  – trichloroethanes
  – trichloroethylene
  – vinyl chloride
  – hydrocarbons, fluorinated
  – chlorofluorocarbons
  – chlorofluorocarbons, methane
  – fluorobenzenes
  – fluorocarbons
  – hydrocarbons, iodinated
  – iodobenzenes
  – 3-iodobenzylguanidine
  – iopanoic acid
  – iophendylate
  – ipodate
  – tyropanoate
  – mustard compounds
  – mustard gas
  – nitrogen mustard compounds
  – aniline mustard
  – chlorambucil
  – prednimustine
  – estramustine
  – mannomustine
  – mechlorethamine
  – melphalan
  – peptichemio
  – phosphoramide mustards
  – cyclophosphamide
  – ifosfamide
  – propylbenzilylcholine mustard
  – quinacrine mustard
  – uracil mustard
  – trihalomethanes
  – chloroform

– paraffin

– petrolatum
  – mineral oil

– terpenes
  – cannabinoids
  – cannabidiol
  – cannabinol
  – tetrahydrocannabinol
  – carotenoids
  – beta carotene
  – norisoprenoids
  – retinoids
  – acitretin
  – etretinate
  – fenretinide
  – isotretinoin
  – retinaldehyde
  – vitamin a
  – tretinoin
  – xanthophylls
  – canthaxanthin
  – lutein
  – zeta carotene
  – diterpenes
  – aconitine
  – aphidicolin
  – atractyloside
  – diterpenes, abietane
  – diterpenes, clerodane
  – diterpenes, kaurane
  – gibberellins
  – forskolin
  – ginkgolides
  – bilobalides
  – phorbols
  – phorbol esters
  – phorbol 12,13-dibutyrate
  – tetradecanoylphorbol acetate
  – phytanic acid
  – phytol
  – vitamin k
  – vitamin k 1
  – vitamin k 2
  – vitamin k 3
  – taxoids
  – paclitaxel
  – dolichol
  – dolichol phosphates
  – gefarnate
  – hemiterpenes
  – monoterpenes
  – iridoids
  – menthol
  – norbornanes
  – bornanes
  – camphor
  – mecamylamine
  – toxaphene
  – pyrethrins
  – allethrin
  – permethrin
  – thymol
  – bromthymol blue
  – polyisoprenyl phosphates
  – dolichol phosphates
  – polyisoprenyl phosphate sugars
  – polyisoprenyl phosphate monosaccharides
  – dolichol monophosphate mannose
  – polyisoprenyl phosphate oligosaccharides
  – sesquiterpenes
  – abscisic acid
  – artemisinins
  – farnesol
  – gossypol
  – santonin
  – sesquiterpenes, eudesmane
  – sesquiterpenes, germacrane
  – sesquiterpenes, guaiane
  – thapsigargin
  – trichothecenes
  – t-2 toxin
  – trichodermin
  – triterpenes
  – ginsenosides
  – glycyrrhetinic acid
  – carbenoxolone
  – glycyrrhizic acid
  – limonins
  – quassins
  – glaucarubin
  – sapogenins
  – oleanolic acid
  – squalene

– imides

– imidoesters
  – dimethyl adipimidate
  – dimethyl suberimidate

– maleimides
  – ethylmaleimide

– pantothenic acid

– phthalimides
  – chlorthalidone

– succinimides
  – bromosuccinimide
  – ethosuximide

– imines

– carbodiimides
  – cme-carbodiimide
  – dicyclohexylcarbodiimide
  – ethyl(dimethylaminopropyl) carbodiimide

– imino acids
  – azetidinecarboxylic acid
  – technetium tc 99m diethyl-iminodiacetic acid
  – technetium tc 99m disofenin
  – technetium tc 99m lidofenin

– imino sugars
  – imino furanoses
  – imino pyranoses

– polyethyleneimine

– schiff bases

– isocyanates

– isothiocyanates
  – 4-acetamido-4'-isothiocyanatostilbene-2,2'-disulfonic acid
  – 4,4'-diisothiocyanostilbene-2,2'-disulfonic acid
  – fluorescein-5-isothiocyanate
  – 1-naphthylisothiocyanate

– toluene 2,4-diisocyanate

– ketones

– acetone

– acetophenones
  – benzoin
  – omega-chloroacetophenone

– benzophenones
  – chlorthalidone

– butanones
  – acetoin
  – diacetyl
  – thenoyltrifluoroacetone

– butyrophenones
  – azaperone
  – benperidol
  – droperidol
  – haloperidol
  – spiperone
  – trifluperidol

– camphor

– cyclohexanones
  – tiletamine

– hexanones
  – methyl n-butyl ketone

– ketone bodies
  – acetoacetates
  – acetone

– mannich bases

– methadone
  – methadyl acetate

– pentanones

– phosgene

– propiophenones
  – bupropion
  – chalcones
  – chalcone
  – hydroxypropiophenone
  – phloretin
  – polyphloretin phosphate
  – kynuramine
  – oxyfedrine
  – propafenone
  – tolperisone

– lactones

– 4-butyrolactone

– dehydroascorbic acid

– macrolides
  – amphotericin b
  – antimycin a
  – brefeldin a
  – candicidin
  – epothilones
  – erythromycin
  – azithromycin
  – clarithromycin
  – erythromycin estolate
  – erythromycin ethylsuccinate
  – ketolides
  – roxithromycin
  – ivermectin
  – josamycin
  – leucomycins
  – kitasamycin
  – spiramycin
  – lucensomycin
  – maytansine
  – mepartricin
  – miocamycin
  – natamycin
  – nystatin
  – oleandomycin
  – troleandomycin
  – oligomycins
  – rutamycin
  – sirolimus
  – tacrolimus
  – tylosin

– propiolactone

– spironolactone

– venturicidins

– zearalenone
  – zeranol

– nitrates

– erythrityl tetranitrate

– nicorandil

– nitriles

– acetonitriles
  – aminoacetonitrile

– acrylonitrile

– aminopropionitrile

– amygdalin

– carbonyl cyanide m-chlorophenyl hydrazone

– carbonyl cyanide-p-trifluoromethoxyphenylhydrazone

– o-chlorobenzylidenemalonitrile

– citalopram

– fadrozole

– pregnenolone carbonitrile

– technetium tc 99m sestamibi

– tyrphostins

– nitrites

– amyl nitrite

– nitro compounds

– aristolochic acids

– dinitrocresols

– nitrobenzenes
  – chloramphenicol
  – thiamphenicol
  – dinitrobenzenes
  – dinitrochlorobenzene
  – dinitrofluorobenzene
  – trinitrobenzenes
  – picryl chloride
  – trinitrobenzenesulfonic acid

– nitrofurans
  – 5-amino-3-((5-nitro-2-furyl)vinyl)-1,2,4-oxadiazole
  – fanft
  – furagin
  – furazolidone
  – furylfuramide
  – nifuratel
  – nifurtimox
  – nitrofurantoin
  – nitrofurazone
  – nitrovin

– nitroglycerin

– nitroimidazoles
  – dimetridazole
  – etanidazole
  – ipronidazole
  – metronidazole
  – misonidazole
  – nimorazole
  – ornidazole
  – ronidazole
  – tinidazole

– nitroparaffins
  – tetranitromethane

– nitrophenols
  – dinitrophenols
  – 2,4-dinitrophenol
  – 2-hydroxy-5-nitrobenzyl bromide
  – niclofolan
  – nitrohydroxyiodophenylacetate
  – nitroxinil
  – picrates

– nitroquinolines
  – 4-nitroquinoline-1-oxide

– nitroso compounds

– nitrosamines
  – butylhydroxybutylnitrosamine
  – diethylnitrosamine
  – dimethylnitrosamine
  – n-nitrosopyrrolidine

– nitrosoguanidines
  – methylnitronitrosoguanidine

– nitrosomethylurethane

– nitrosourea compounds
  – carmustine
  – ethylnitrosourea
  – lomustine
  – semustine
  – methylnitrosourea
  – nimustine
  – streptozocin

– reactive nitrogen species
  – s-nitrosothiols
  – s-nitroso-n-acetylpenicillamine
  – s-nitrosoglutathione

– onium compounds

– quaternary ammonium compounds
  – ambenonium chloride
  – benzalkonium compounds
  – benzethonium
  – bephenium compounds
  – betaine
  – betalains
  – betacyanins
  – betaxanthins
  – bethanechol compounds
  – bethanechol
  – bretylium compounds
  – bretylium tosylate
  – cetrimonium compounds
  – chlorisondamine
  – chlormequat
  – (4-(m-chlorophenylcarbamoyloxy)-2-butynyl)trimethylammonium chloride
  – choline
  – benzoylcholine
  – carbachol
  – cytidine diphosphate choline
  – phosphorylcholine
  – platelet activating factor
  – propylbenzilylcholine mustard
  – succinylcholine
  – thiocholine
  – acetylthiocholine
  – butyrylthiocholine
  – edrophonium
  – emepronium
  – gallamine triethiodide
  – glycopyrrolate
  – hemicholinium 3
  – lissamine green dyes
  – methacholine compounds
  – methacholine chloride
  – bis-trimethylammonium compounds
  – decamethonium compounds
  – hexamethonium compounds
  – hexamethonium
  – muscarine
  – neostigmine
  – oxyphenonium
  – propantheline
  – tetraethylammonium compounds
  – tetraethylammonium
  – toxiferine
  – alcuronium
  – tubocurarine

– sulfonium compounds

– organometallic compounds

– antimony potassium tartrate

– antimony sodium gluconate

– arsenicals
  – arsanilic acid
  – arsenamide
  – arsenates
  – arsenazo iii
  – arsenites
  – arsphenamine
  – p-azobenzenearsonate
  – cacodylic acid
  – melarsoprol
  – roxarsone

– ferric compounds
  – iron-dextran complex

– ferrous compounds

– gadolinium dtpa

– maneb

– organogold compounds
  – aurothioglucose
  – auranofin
  – gold sodium thiomalate

– organomercury compounds
  – alkylmercury compounds
  – chlormerodrin
  – ethylmercury compounds
  – cialit
  – ethylmercuric chloride
  – thimerosal
  – mersalyl
  – methylmercury compounds
  – merbromin
  – phenylmercury compounds
  – chloromercurinitrophenols
  – 4-chloromercuribenzenesulfonate
  – mercuribenzoates
  – chloromercuribenzoates
  – p-chloromercuribenzoic acid
  – hydroxymercuribenzoates
  – phenylmercuric acetate

– organoplatinum compounds
  – carboplatin

– organotechnetium compounds
  – technetium tc 99m aggregated albumin
  – technetium tc 99m diethyl-iminodiacetic acid
  – technetium tc 99m dimercaptosuccinic acid
  – technetium tc 99m disofenin
  – technetium tc 99m exametazime
  – technetium tc 99m lidofenin
  – technetium tc 99m medronate
  – technetium tc 99m mertiatide
  – technetium tc 99m pentetate
  – technetium tc 99m sestamibi

– organotin compounds
  – trialkyltin compounds
  – triethyltin compounds
  – trimethyltin compounds

– sucralfate

– tetraethyl lead

– zineb

– organophosphorus compounds

– aminoethylphosphonic acid

– armin

– carbamyl phosphate

– chlorfenvinphos

– dichlorvos

– diphosphoglyceric acids
  – 2,3-diphosphoglycerate

– diphosphonates
  – alendronate
  – clodronic acid
  – etidronic acid
  – technetium tc 99m medronate

– fosinopril

– hempa

– isoflurophate

– mevinphos

– monocrotophos

– naled

– organothiophosphorus compounds
  – amifostine
  – azinphosmethyl
  – chlorpyrifos
  – coumaphos
  – cystaphos
  – diazinon
  – dimethoate
  – disulfoton
  – echothiophate iodide
  – fenitrothion
  – fenthion
  – fonofos
  – leptophos
  – malathion
  – parathion
  – methyl parathion
  – phenylphosphonothioic acid, 2-ethyl 2-(4-nitrophenyl) ester
  – phorate
  – phosmet
  – temefos
  – thiophosphoric acid esters
  – thiotepa

– paraoxon

– phosphamidon

– phosphines

– phosphinic acids

– phosphonic acids
  – fosfomycin
  – phosphonoacetic acid
  – foscarnet
  – trichlorfon

– phosphoramide mustards
  – cyclophosphamide
  – ifosfamide

– phosphoranes

– phosphoric acid esters

– phosphorous acids
  – phosphites

– polyisoprenyl phosphates
  – dolichol phosphates

– sarin

– soman

– tetrachlorvinphos

– tetraisopropylpyrophosphamide

– tritolyl phosphates

– organoselenium compounds

– selenocysteine

– selenomethionine

– organosilicon compounds

– silanes

– siloxanes
  – silicones
  – dimethylpolysiloxanes
  – simethicone
  – silicone gels
  – silicone oils

– trimethylsilyl compounds

– peroxides

– artemisinins

– lipid peroxides

– tert-butylhydroperoxide

– tetraoxanes

– phenols

– aminophenols

– anisoles
  – anethole trithione
  – butylated hydroxyanisole
  – guaiacol
  – guaifenesin
  – methocarbamol

– bisphenol a-glycidyl methacrylate

– bithionol

– bromphenol blue

– catechols
  – curcumin
  – estrogens, catechol
  – hydroxyestrones
  – guaiacol
  – guaifenesin
  – 3-methoxy-4-hydroxyphenylethanol
  – nordihydroguaiaretic acid
  – tiron

– chlorophenols
  – dichlorophen
  – hexachlorophene
  – pentachlorophenol

– cresols
  – bisacodyl
  – brocresine
  – bromcresol green
  – bromcresol purple
  – butylated hydroxytoluene
  – creosote
  – cyclofenil
  – dinitrocresols
  – formocresols
  – tritolyl phosphates

– dienestrol

– humic substances

– hydroquinones

– hydroxybenzoic acids
  – gallic acid
  – hydrolyzable tannins
  – propyl gallate
  – hydroxymercuribenzoates
  – pactamycin
  – parabens
  – salicylic acids
  – aminosalicylic acids
  – p-aminosalicylic acid
  – mesalamine
  – anacardic acids
  – aspirin
  – diflunisal
  – salicylic acid
  – salicylates
  – gentisates
  – sodium salicylate
  – vanillic acid

– indophenol
  – 2,6-dichloroindophenol

– nitrophenols
  – dinitrophenols
  – 2,4-dinitrophenol
  – 2-hydroxy-5-nitrobenzyl bromide
  – niclofolan
  – nitrohydroxyiodophenylacetate
  – nitroxinil
  – picrates

– phenol

– phenolphthaleins
  – phenolphthalein
  – phenolsulfonphthalein
  – sulfobromophthalein
  – thymolphthalein

– phloroglucinol
  – phloretin
  – polyphloretin phosphate

– probucol

– propofol

– pyrogallol

– resorcinols
  – hexylresorcinol
  – zearalenone
  – zeranol

– quinones

– anthraquinones
  – carmine
  – cascara
  – emodin
  – mitoxantrone

– benzoquinones
  – carbazilquinone
  – chloranil
  – dibromothymoquinone
  – plastoquinone
  – ubiquinone

– indolequinones
  – mitomycins
  – mitomycin
  – porfiromycin
  – pyrroloiminoquinones

– naphthoquinones
  – vitamin k 1
  – vitamin k 2
  – vitamin k 3

– rotaxanes

– semicarbazides

– diphenylcarbazide

– semicarbazones
  – thiosemicarbazones
  – methisazone
  – thioacetazone

– sulfur compounds

– amino acids, sulfur
  – cystathionine
  – cysteic acid
  – cysteine
  – acetylcysteine
  – carbocysteine
  – cysteinyldopa
  – cystine
  – selenocysteine
  – ethionine
  – homocysteine
  – s-adenosylhomocysteine
  – homocystine
  – methionine
  – s-adenosylmethionine
  – n-formylmethionine
  – n-formylmethionine leucyl-phenylalanine
  – methionine sulfoximine
  – buthionine sulfoximine
  – selenomethionine
  – vitamin u
  – penicillamine
  – s-nitroso-n-acetylpenicillamine
  – thiopronine
  – thiorphan

– benzothiepins
  – endosulfan

– cyclic s-oxides

– isothiocyanates
  – 4-acetamido-4'-isothiocyanatostilbene-2,2'-disulfonic acid
  – 4,4'-diisothiocyanostilbene-2,2'-disulfonic acid
  – fluorescein-5-isothiocyanate
  – 1-naphthylisothiocyanate

– organothiophosphorus compounds
  – amifostine
  – azinphosmethyl
  – chlorpyrifos
  – coumaphos
  – cystaphos
  – diazinon
  – dimethoate
  – disulfoton
  – echothiophate iodide
  – fenitrothion
  – fenthion
  – fonofos
  – leptophos
  – malathion
  – parathion
  – methyl parathion
  – phenylphosphonothioic acid, 2-ethyl 2-(4-nitrophenyl) ester
  – phorate
  – phosmet
  – temefos
  – thiophosphoric acid esters
  – thiotepa

– phenothiazines
  – acepromazine
  – azure stains
  – chlorpromazine
  – fluphenazine
  – mesoridazine
  – methotrimeprazine
  – methylene blue
  – moricizine
  – nonachlazine
  – perazine
  – perphenazine
  – prochlorperazine
  – promazine
  – promethazine
  – thiethylperazine
  – thioridazine
  – tolonium chloride
  – trifluoperazine
  – triflupromazine
  – trimeprazine

– sulfhydryl compounds
  – cysteine
  – dimercaprol
  – unithiol
  – ergothioneine
  – mercaptoethanol
  – mercaptoethylamines
  – cysteamine
  – 3-mercaptopropionic acid
  – 6-mercaptopurine
  – mesna
  – methimazole
  – pantetheine
  – s-nitrosothiols
  – s-nitroso-n-acetylpenicillamine
  – s-nitrosoglutathione
  – succimer
  – technetium tc 99m dimercaptosuccinic acid
  – thioglycolates
  – thiomalates
  – gold sodium thiomalate

– sulfides
  – disulfides
  – cystine
  – disulfiram

– sulfones
  – dansyl compounds
  – dapsone
  – acedapsone
  – phenylmethylsulfonyl fluoride
  – sulfonamides
  – benzolamide
  – benzothiadiazines
  – bendroflumethiazide
  – chlorothiazide
  – hydrochlorothiazide
  – trichlormethiazide
  – cyclopenthiazide
  – diazoxide
  – hydroflumethiazide
  – methyclothiazide
  – polythiazide
  – bumetanide
  – chloramines
  – chlorthalidone
  – clopamide
  – dichlorphenamide
  – ethoxzolamide
  – indapamide
  – 1-(5-isoquinolinesulfonyl)-2-methylpiperazine
  – mafenide
  – mefruside
  – metolazone
  – probenecid
  – sulfanilamides
  – furosemide
  – sulfacetamide
  – sulfachlorpyridazine
  – sulfadiazine
  – silver sulfadiazine
  – sulfadimethoxine
  – sulfadoxine
  – sulfaguanidine
  – sulfalene
  – sulfamerazine
  – sulfameter
  – sulfamethazine
  – sulfamethoxazole
  – trimethoprim-sulfamethoxazole combination
  – sulfamethoxypyridazine
  – sulfamonomethoxine
  – sulfamoxole
  – sulfaphenazole
  – sulfapyridine
  – sulfaquinoxaline
  – sulfathiazoles
  – sulfamethizole
  – sulfisomidine
  – sulfisoxazole
  – sulfasalazine
  – sumatriptan
  – xipamide
  – sulfonylurea compounds
  – acetohexamide
  – carbutamide
  – chlorpropamide
  – gliclazide
  – glipizide
  – glyburide
  – tolazamide
  – tolbutamide
  – tosyl compounds
  – bromcresol green
  – bromcresol purple
  – bromphenol blue
  – bromthymol blue
  – tosylarginine methyl ester
  – tosyllysine chloromethyl ketone
  – tosylphenylalanyl chloromethyl ketone

– sulfonium compounds

– sulfoxides
  – dimethyl sulfoxide
  – omeprazole

– sulfur acids
  – sulfenic acids
  – sulfinic acids
  – sulfonic acids
  – alkanesulfonic acids
  – alkanesulfonates
  – mesna
  – mesylates
  – busulfan
  – ethyl methanesulfonate
  – methyl methanesulfonate
  – sodium dodecyl sulfate
  – sodium tetradecyl sulfate
  – hepes
  – isethionic acid
  – taurine
  – taurocholic acid
  – taurodeoxycholic acid
  – taurochenodeoxycholic acid
  – taurolithocholic acid
  – arylsulfonic acids
  – arylsulfonates
  – benzenesulfonates
  – calcium dobesilate
  – 4-chloromercuribenzenesulfonate
  – ethamsylate
  – ferrozine
  – polyanetholesulfonate
  – tiron
  – lissamine green dyes
  – naphthalenesulfonates
  – amaranth dye
  – amido black
  – anilino naphthalenesulfonates
  – congo red
  – Evans blue
  – suramin
  – trypan blue
  – sulfanilic acids
  – trinitrobenzenesulfonic acid
  – thiosulfonic acids
  – sulfuric acids
  – pentosan sulfuric polyester
  – sulfuric acid esters

– thiazides
  – benzothiadiazines
  – bendroflumethiazide
  – chlorothiazide
  – hydrochlorothiazide
  – trichlormethiazide
  – cyclopenthiazide
  – diazoxide
  – hydroflumethiazide
  – methyclothiazide
  – polythiazide

– thiazines
  – chlormezanone
  – nifurtimox
  – piroxicam
  – thiadiazines
  – xylazine

– thiazoles
  – chlormethiazole
  – dithiazanine
  – ethoxzolamide
  – famotidine
  – fanft
  – firefly luciferin
  – levamisole
  – niridazole
  – nizatidine
  – oxythiamine
  – rhodanine
  – riluzole
  – ritonavir
  – saccharin
  – sulfathiazoles
  – tetramisole
  – thiabendazole
  – thiadiazoles
  – acetazolamide
  – benzolamide
  – methazolamide
  – timolol
  – thiamine
  – fursultiamin
  – thiamine monophosphate
  – thiamine pyrophosphate
  – thiamine triphosphate
  – thiazolidinediones

– thiepins
  – dibenzothiepins
  – dothiepin
  – methiothepin
  – thiazepines
  – dibenzothiazepines

– thioamides
  – thioacetamide

– thiocarbamates
  – dimethyldithiocarbamate
  – thiram
  – ziram
  – ditiocarb
  – disulfiram
  – ethylenebis(dithiocarbamates)
  – maneb
  – zineb
  – methomyl
  – tolnaftate
  – triallate

– thiocyanates

– thioglycosides
  – dithioerythritol
  – dithiothreitol
  – sucralfate
  – thiogalactosides
  – isopropyl thiogalactoside
  – thioglucosides
  – glucosinolates

– thiones

– thionucleosides
  – thioinosine
  – methylthioinosine
  – thiouridine

– thionucleotides
  – guanosine 5'-o-(3-thiotriphosphate)

– thiophenes
  – carticaine
  – ketotifen
  – morantel
  – pizotyline
  – pyrantel
  – pyrantel pamoate
  – pyrantel tartrate
  – thenoyltrifluoroacetone
  – thioctic acid
  – ticlopidine
  – ticrynafen
  – tiletamine

– thiosemicarbazones
  – methisazone
  – thioacetazone

– thiourea
  – beta-aminoethyl isothiourea
  – burimamide
  – dimaprit
  – guanylthiourea
  – isothiuronium
  – methallibure
  – metiamide
  – noxythiolin
  – phenylthiourea
  – phenylthiazolylthiourea
  – thiophanate

– triazenes

– dacarbazine

– diminazene

– urea

– biureas

– biuret

– bromisovalum

– hydroxyurea

– methylurea compounds

– nitrosourea compounds
  – carmustine
  – ethylnitrosourea
  – lomustine
  – semustine
  – methylnitrosourea
  – nimustine
  – streptozocin

– phenylurea compounds
  – carbanilides
  – imidocarb
  – nicarbazin
  – celiprolol
  – diflubenzuron
  – diuron
  – linuron

– sulfonylurea compounds
  – acetohexamide
  – carbutamide
  – chlorpropamide
  – gliclazide
  – glyburide
  – tolazamide
  – tolbutamide

– thiourea
  – beta-aminoethyl isothiourea
  – burimamide
  – dimaprit
  – ethylenethiourea
  – guanylthiourea
  – isothiuronium
  – methallibure
  – metiamide
  – noxythiolin
  – phenylthiourea
  – phenylthiazolylthiourea
  – thiophanate

The list continues at List of MeSH codes (D03).

D02